Petersberg is a mountain in the Flintsbach municipality of Bavaria, Germany. Situated in the eastern foothills of the Mangfall Mountains, some 400 meters above the Inn valley, it is noteworthy for its (short-lived) medieval monastery of Saint Peter's on the Madron, the church of which however retained its importance as a pilgrimage site.

Mountains of Bavaria
Mountains of the Alps